The Khayelitsha tavern shooting was a mass shooting which occurred on the morning of 8 March 2020. It took place at a tavern in Site B, Khayelitsha and resulted in the deaths of seven people. An additional seven people were injured in the shooting including a six-year-old girl. Six people were shot dead at the tavern at the time of the event. The body of the seventh victim, the owner of the house the tavern was based in, was found a short while later at another location. A 32 year old suspect allegedly involved in the shooting was arrested the following day. A representative for the Western Cape provincial government stated there were fifteen previous mass shootings in the area that had similarities with this event.

References

2020 murders in South Africa
2020 mass shootings in Africa
21st-century mass murder in Africa
Attacks on bars
March 2020 crimes in Africa
March 2020 events in South Africa
Mass murder in 2020

Mass shootings in South Africa
Murder in South Africa
Western Cape